Kachek Bel-e Olya (also Romanized as Kachek Bel-e ‘Olyā; also known as Kajak Bel-e ‘Olyā and Kūchek Bel-e ‘Olyā) is a village in Gurani Rural District, Gahvareh District, Dalahu County, Kermanshah Province, Iran. At the 2006 census, its population was 194, in 42 families.

References 

Populated places in Dalahu County